North Toronto Nitros is a Canadian semi-professional soccer club based in Toronto, Ontario. The club was founded in 1980 as a youth soccer club and added its men's semi-professional club in League1 Ontario in 2016 and it's women's team in the League1 Ontario women's division in 2021.

History
The club was founded in 1980 as a youth soccer club. They updated the club logo in 2019, combining the club logo and Nitros team logo.

Originally a youth soccer club, the team added a men's semi-professional team in League1 Ontario in 2016, playing their home games at the University of Toronto's Varsity Stadium. They played their inaugural match on April 30, 2016, on the road against Vaughan Azzurri, which they lost by a score of 2–1. They defeated Aurora United by a score of 5–0 in their home debut.

In 2018, the club departed the league, going on hiatus. Two years later, they were set to return to the league for the 2020 season and also added a women's team to the League1 Ontario women's division for the first time, providing a full senior high-performance pathway for players based in downtown Toronto, however, due to the COVID-19 pandemic, the season was cancelled, delaying their return (and the women's team's debut) to 2021. They moved their home field to the Downsview Park turf fields.

Seasons 
Men

Women

Notable former players
The following players have either played at the professional or international level, either before or after playing for the League1 Ontario team:

Men

Women

References

League1 Ontario teams
Sport in Toronto
Soccer clubs in Toronto